Liefers is a surname. Notable people with the surname include:

Gert-Jan Liefers (born 1978), Dutch middle-distance runner
Jan Josef Liefers (born 1964), German actor, producer, director, and musician